Thestor barbatus, the bearded skolly, is a butterfly of the family Lycaenidae. It is found in South Africa, where it is only known from the West Cape in Nama Karoo at the Paardenberg and in the northern foothills of the Outeniqua Mountains.

The wingspan is 32–38 mm for males and 36–40 mm for females. Adults are on wing in December. There is one generation per year.

References

Thestor
Butterflies described in 1997
Endemic butterflies of South Africa